The India men's national junior ice hockey team is the men's national under-20 ice hockey team of India. The team is controlled by the Ice Hockey Association of India, a member of the International Ice Hockey Federation. In December 2017 the team made their international debut at the 2018 IIHF U20 Challenge Cup of Asia where they finished in last place after losing all of their games.

History
The India men's national junior ice hockey team debuted at the 2018 IIHF U20 Challenge Cup of Asia in Kuala Lumpur, Malaysia. Their opening game of the tournament was against the United Arab Emirates which they lost 0–6. India went on to lose their other three games of the tournament against Kyrgyzstan, Malaysia and the Philippines, finishing the tournament in last place. The loss to Kyrgyzstan of 2–13 is currently the teams worst on record. Forward Tsewang Dorjay was selected as best Kyrgyz player of the tournament.

International competitions
2018 IIHF U20 Challenge Cup of Asia. Finish: 5th

References

Ice hockey in India
Junior national ice hockey teams
National ice hockey teams in Asia
Ice hockey